Weiden in der Oberpfalz (official name: Weiden i.d.OPf.; Northern Bavarian: Weidn in da Owapfalz) is a district-free city in Bavaria, Germany. A branch of the German Army is located here.

History
Weiden in der Oberpfalz was first mentioned in a document in 1241 as Weiden. It is assumed that the first settlements in Weiden are dated the year 1000. Located at the intersection of two major trading routes (Goldene Strasse and Magdeburger Strasse), Weiden soon became an important trading center with a population of 2,200 in 1531.
An economic boom came along in 1863 when Weiden was connected to the railroad network. Some major companies of the glass and china industry settled in Weiden and the population increased.

Districts

Incorporations into Weiden in der Oberpfalz
January 1, 1914, Moosbürg, district of Moosbürg, Ermersricht, Fichtenbühl, Leihstadtmühle
February 1, 1915, Tröglersricht and Zollhaus
July 1, 1972, Frauenricht, district of Frauenricht, Halmesricht, Latsch, Spitalöd
July 1, 1972, Muglhof, district of Muglhof, Matzlesrieth, Mitterhöll, Unterhöll, Oedentahl, Trauschendorf
July 1, 1972, Neunkirchen bei Weiden, district of Neunkirchen, Brandweiher, Wiesendorf
May 1, 1978, Rothenstadt, district of Rothenstadt, Maierhof, Mallersricht, Neubau Ullersricht
May 1, 1978, Moosöd

Main sights

Historical buildings
St. Josef. Catholic church, built 1899–1900, Neo Romanesque style with art nouveau interior.
Marktplatz, the market square stretched between Upper and Lower Gates with numerous renaissance buildings.
Altes Rathaus ("Old Town Hall"), built between 1539 and 1545 by Hans Nopl.
St. Michael. A Protestant church, rebuilt several times. The church got its present baroque appearance from 1627, the tower from 1761.
Alte Stadtmauer, partially preserved old city walls from the 14th century.
St. Sebastian Kirche. Catholic chapel, built around 1480.

Museums
International Ceramic Museum
City Museum - exhibits art, furniture and porcelain from the early 16th century to the 19th century. There is a room dedicated to composer Max Reger, who lived and studied in Weiden.

Twin towns – sister cities

Weiden in der Oberpfalz is twinned with:
 Issy-les-Moulineaux, France (1962)
 Macerata, Italy (1963)
 Weiden am See, Austria (1990)
 Annaberg-Buchholz, Germany (1990)
 Mariánské Lázně, Czech Republic (2008)

Geography

Climate
This area is characterized by equable climates with few extremes of temperature and ample precipitation in all months. The Köppen Climate Classification subtype for this climate is "Cfb". (Marine West Coast Climate).

Notable people
Erhard Weigel (1625–1699), astronomer and mathematician
Franz Ferdinand von Rummel (1644–1716), Prince-Bishop in Vienna
Max Reger (1873–1916), composer and organist
Eduard Zintl (1898–1941), chemist
Otto Ambros (1901–1990), chemist and a Nazi war criminal
Martin Gottfried Weiss (1905–1946), SS Commander of German concentration camps executed for war crimes
Elisabeth Schärtel (1919–2012), mezzo-soprano
Erich Bäumler (1930–2003), footballer
Marga Schiml (born 1945), opera singer
Monika Henzinger (born 1966), computer scientist
Michael Brenner (born 1964), historian
Benedikt Schopper (born 1985), ice hockey player
Sandro Schoenberger (born 1987), professional ice hockey player
Nadine Kraus (born 1988), footballer
Sven Kopp (born 1995), footballer
Dennis Lippert (born 1996), footballer

Notes

External links

  
 Webcams in Weiden
 Website on St. Josef Church, including pictures and a guide